Richard Duck D.D. (also Doke or Dooke) was an English 16th-century college fellow and university vice-chancellor at the University of Oxford.

Duck was a Doctor of Divinity and a Fellow of Exeter College, Oxford. In 1517, Duck was appointed Vice-Chancellor of Oxford University, continuing until 1520.

Duck was appointed Archdeacon of Salisbury in 1536.

References

Bibliography
 

Year of birth unknown
Year of death unknown
Fellows of Exeter College, Oxford
Vice-Chancellors of the University of Oxford
16th-century English Roman Catholic priests
16th-century English Anglican priests
Archdeacons of Salisbury